Myristica lepidota is a species of tree in the family Myristicaceae. It is found in E Moluccas and W & SW New Guinea. There are two subspecies contained within:

 M. lepidota subsp. lepidota Blume - S Moluccas (Aru Islands) & SW Papua Barat
 M. lepidota subsp. montanoides (Warb.) W.J. de Wilde - NE Moluccas (Ternate, Obi, Bacan), Papua Barat

References

Trees of Malesia
lepidota